Dee Edwards is a British, London-based entrepreneur and founder of Habbo with Aapo and Sampo. She was the managing director of the teen community internet company since it launched in 2001.

Edwards now runs a travel company in London called Tell Tale Travel.

External links
 Tell Tale Travel

References 

Living people
English businesspeople
Year of birth missing (living people)